Events during the year 1158 in Italy.

Events 
In June 1158, Emperor Frederick Barbarossa set out upon his second Italian expedition. During this expedition:
 The Diet of Roncaglia near Piacenza was first convoked by Frederick Barbarossa.
 The University of Bologna, the oldest continually operating university in the world, was granted its first privileges by the Emperor.

Deaths

Geoffrey VI, Count of Anjou (1134–1158)

References

Years of the 12th century in Italy
Italy
Italy